Israeli football clubs have competed in international football tournaments since 1967, when Hapoel Tel Aviv played in the inaugural Asian Champion Club Tournament. Two Israeli clubs, Hapoel Tel Aviv and Maccabi Tel Aviv, competed in all four editions of the Asian Champion Club Tournament before it was discontinued after the 1972 edition was cancelled. The Israel Football Association was expelled from the AFC in 1974, with Israeli clubs not being invited to take part in the competition when it was revived as the Asian Club Championship (now the AFC Champions League) in 1985.

Between 1976 and 1994, Israeli clubs took part in the Intertoto Cup, which was the only international club competition available until 1990 due to the Israeli FA not being affiliated to any confederation. 

Israel was admitted to UEFA in 1991 and Israeli clubs participated European football tournaments since 1992, when Maccabi Tel Aviv and Hapoel Petah Tikva played in the Champions League and the Cup Winners' Cup (respectively).  Since 1992, Israeli clubs have taken part in the UEFA Champions League, UEFA Cup, UEFA Cup Winners' Cup, UEFA Europa League and UEFA Intertoto Cup.

Full Asian record

Performance table

Intertoto Cup (1976–1994)

Israeli teams first appeared in the Intertoto Cup in 1976, with Hapoel Be'er Sheva and Beitar Jerusalem, champions and runners-up in the previous season, debuting. In 1979, due to the cost of travelling to Europe, only one team, Maccabi Netanya was entered into the competition, and between 1980 and 1992 the two Israeli entrants played in one group to reduce travelling expenses. In 1993 and 1994, as the format of the competition was changed to allow participating teams to play only two away matches, Israeli teams were allocated to two different groups.

Performance table

Full European record

Israeli clubs have participated in UEFA tournaments since 1992–93. Maccabi Haifa three times, Maccabi Tel Aviv twice and Hapoel Tel Aviv had managed to qualify to the Champions League group stage. The same clubs, along with Maccabi Petah Tikva and Ironi Kiryat Shmona qualified to the UEFA Cup/Europa League group stage. The furthest any club reached in a European tournament was the quarter-finals, reached by Maccabi Haifa in 1998–99 and by Hapoel Tel Aviv in 2001–02.

Performance table

Update: 8 September 2022, * currently in indicated competition.

Notes:
 The total appearances column sum all club appearances by seasons and not by competitions (i.e. for a club which played in CL and EL in one season, only one appearance is calculated in the total column, while one appearance is calculated for each competition).
 Maccabi Haifa had beaten FC Haka 4–0 in 2001–02, which was later awarded to HJK as a walkover win due to Maccabi Haifa fielding a suspended player. The original score is included in the table.
 Maccabi Tel Aviv had beaten PAOK 2–1 in 2004–05, which was later awarded to Maccabi Tel Aviv as a walkover win due to PAOK fielding a suspended player. The original score is included in the table.
 In 2013–14 UEFA Europa League Maccabi Tel Aviv were drawn to meet PAOK in the Play-off round. However, on 14 August 2013, Metalist Kharkiv were disqualified from the 2013–14 UEFA club competitions because of previous match-fixing.  UEFA decided to replace Metalist Kharkiv in the Champions League play-off round with PAOK, who were eliminated by Metalist Kharkiv in the third qualifying round.  Thus, Maccabi Tel Aviv, the opponent of PAOK in the Europa League play-off round, qualified directly for the Europa League group stage without playing any match in the play-off round. The two cancelled matches are not included in the table.

References

 
European football clubs in international competitions